The Scottish Women's Hospital at Royaumont was a medical hospital during World War I active from January 1915 to March 1919 operated by Scottish Women's Hospitals (SWH), under the direction of the French Red Cross and located at Royaumont Abbey. The Abbey is a former Cistercian abbey, located near Asnières-sur-Oise in Val-d'Oise, approximately 30 km north of Paris, France. The hospital was started by Dr Frances Ivens and founder of SWH, Dr Elsie Maud Inglis. It was especially noted for its performance treating soldiers involved in the Battle of the Somme.

The hospital was officially known as the Hôpital Auxiliaire 301 and was never affiliated with the British military or British Red Cross. Nora Neilson Gray's painting was called Hôpital Auxiliaire 1918  was not originally accepted by the Imperial War Museum. The soldiers treated at Royaumont were mostly French with some Senegalese and North Africans from the French colonial troops. It was not the only facility of its kind; other female hospital units in France include the Women's Hospital Corps established by Louisa Garrett Anderson and Flora Murray and the Women's Imperial Service League established by Florence Stoney in Paris and Boulogne, but SWH was the largest such group with other locations in Serbia, Greece, Romania, and Corsica. Royaumont was the largest British voluntary hospital, one of the closest such hospitals to the front line, and the only one to operate continuously from January 1915 to March 1919. An ancillary hospital to Royaumont was established even closer to the front line-at Villers-Cotterêts.

Beginnings

The SWH initially organized two units of 100 beds each to be entirely staffed by women partially funded by the affiliated National Union of Women's Suffrage Societies. The UK War Office and the British Red Cross turned down the offered units and the women turned to the French and Belgian Red Cross. Goüin was a rich industrialist and philanthropist whose poor health rendered him unable to fight and offering the use of the facility was to be part of his contribution to the war.

Although the facility was not ready to be used as a hospital, Dr. Ivens was very happy with the location, writing in 1917: "Although within sounds of the guns, its architectural beauty and the forest scenery in the neighbourhood made it an ideal spot in which the wounded soldiers could forget for a time the horrors and discomfort of war," When wards were overfilled, patients were occasionally carted outdoors between May and October. Noticing that patients so placed recovered more quickly, doctors later accommodated patients outside to increase exposure to sunlight.

Facilities

Patients generally arrived from the Western Front by train to the evacuation station in Creil (12 km away). There was no possibility of transferring patients to other nearby hospitals and patient load was occasionally extreme. During the Battle of the Somme, the surgeons and doctors worked for eight days with a total of only 16 hours of sleep. Conditions at the facility were occasionally insufficient and the hospital failed an initial inspection before opening on 13 January 1915. Electricity was at times intermittent and in case of an outage surgeries were performed by candlelight.

Research
Doctors at Royaumont also undertook cutting-edge research, focusing on the treatment of gas gangrene. The doctors found X-ray and bacteriology for diagnosis and surgical debridement of affected tissue and antiserum therapy to be especially effective. Doctors at the facility believed the collaboration of different specialties was important in fighting infection and avoiding excess amputations. The hospital had a mobile X-ray car manufactured by Austins and purchased for £300. Installation of the X-ray equipment was assisted by Marie Curie and included water and electrical sources independent of the rest of the facility. The X-ray car was highly coveted; other hospitals in the area occasionally used it and the British military attempted to impound and keep the car for itself. In spite of their work, Dr. Ivans was restricted in her ability to publish and present her results.

Doctors at the Scottish Hospital at Royaumont made numerous important discoveries, although their contribution was not always acknowledged and their work required rediscovery. Dr Agnes Savill presented to the Royal Society of Medicine in 1916 her work in the use of X-rays to diagnose the presence of gas gangrene infection before the bacteriological reports could and before the advent of symptoms. This work was not widely accepted and in 1917 she expressed a desire that other radiologists consider this work to confirm her conclusions. Dr. Ivens presented on a similar topic and both Dr. Ivens and Dr. Savill's presentations were reviewed in the British Medical Journal. In related work, Dr E. J. Dalyell published in the British Medical Journal  in 1917 about the presence of B. oedematiens in gas gangrene. Subsequent work on the use of X-ray for the diagnosis of gas gangrene do not refer to the work of SMH doctors. Among other work, Dr L.M. Henry wrote an MD thesis on the treatment of wounds that she presented in 1920.

Reception

Among official recognition, Maréchal Joffre visited the hospital and twice sent a representative, Lt Colonel Rampsont, on his behalf. The French president, Raymond Poincaré and his wife visited on 20 September 1916. In 1918, General Henri Jean Descoings wrote: "We will never be able to express adequately to the Scottish ladies at Royaumont and Villers Cotterêt our gratitude for their devotion to the French wounded’. Villers Cotterêt was a field ambulance established by the Royaumont doctors in 1917. The Comtesse de Courson, in her review of efforts during the war, also believed there was initially French resistance to female doctors, but that the doctors were well qualified and respected.

Female medical students in the UK raised money for the SWH and positions in the organization were desired. The group was also supported by, for instance, Dr Louisa Garrett Anderson (daughter of Elizabeth, pioneer of medical education for women, a suffragette and Chief Surgeon of the Women's Hospital Corps).

Legacy

After the war the Chief Medical Officer, Dr Frances Ivens CBE MS(Lond) ChM(Liverp) FRGOG (1870–1944), was awarded membership of the Légion d'honneur.

In spite of this support, Dr Ivens could not obtain a commission as a doctor in the British Army. While by the end of the war she gained a formal appointment within the French military; besides her own decoration, six other Royaumont doctors were awarded the Croix de Guerre; however there is no mention of the hospital in the British Official Medical History of the War and no British medals were given to the staff. Winston Churchill praised their work in a letter to the MP A. F. Whyte: "The record of their work in Russia and Rumania lit up by the fame of Elsie Inglis will shine in history. Their achievements in France and Serbia and Greece and other theatres were no less valuable, and no body of women has won higher reputation for organizing power and for efficacy in works of mercy."

Many of the doctors left general practice after the war. An exception was Dr L. Aldrich-Blake who worked in obstetrics and gynaecology. The women established the Royaumont Association after the unit disbanded in 1919 and there was an attempt to establish another SWH unit at Royaumont at the onset of World War II, but this failed.

List of hospital staff

Doctors

Dr Louisa Aldrich-Blake - surgeon (later worked in obstetrics and gynaecology)	
Dr Agnes Forbes Blackadder Savill - Radiologist
Dr Elizabeth Butler - Pathologist (wife of Frederick Butler) 
Dr Elizabeth Courtauld - anaesthetist
Dr Elsie Jean Dalyell
Dr Lydia Manly Henry - Surgeon
Dr Elsie Maud Inglis
Dr Florence Elsie Inglis - Niece of Elsie Maud Inglis
Dr Frances Ivens - Chief Medical Officer in Charge of Royaumont
Dr Helen Lillie - Surgeon

Dr Louisa Martindale - Also worked at other SWH facilities
Dr Helen McDougall
Dr Ruth Nicholson - Assistant surgeon
Dr Gladys Miall-Smith
Dr Winifred Margaret Ross - surgeon
Dr Marian Elizabeth Wilson - died July 1917 of acute appendicitis

Other staff
Transcriptions of the names of nurses involved with the Scottish Women's Hospitals taken from original lists held at the Imperial War Museum originally published in early 1920 are available at "Scarletfinders: Scottish Women's Hospitals Index of Names".

A complete list in also available online.

A selection of individuals is listed below.

Charlotte Almond - Orderly
Millicent Sylvia Armstrong - Orderly
Isobel Dorothy Banks - Ambulance Driver
Gertude Beckett - Nurse
Frederick Butler - Ambulance Driver
Lucy Helen Carmichael - Orderly
Marjorie Chapman - Nurse LI
Elizabeth Colledge
Vera Christina Chute Collum - X-ray assistant
Patricia Ramsay Crabb - Nurse
Margaret Charlotte Davidson - Orderly then Nurse 
Margaret Balfour Doig - Nurse
Alma Dolling - Orderly
Ruby Jamieson Donaldson - Orderly
Chloris Sarah Drabble - Nurse
Ariadne Mavis Dunderdale - Nurse
Margaret Fairle - Orderly
Catherine Maggie Findlay - Cook
Isabel Kelman Flett - Nurse
Elizabeth Forbes - Orderly and Storekeeper
Madame Fox - Seamstress
Elizabeth Gilmour Manuel Arthur - Orderly
Mary Gray - Nurse (died at Royaumont of appendicitis in January 1916)
Margaret Gray

Norah Neilson Gray - Nurse
Edith Catherine Hacon - Orderly, Housekeeper, and Seamstress
Cecily Hamilton - Nurse, clerk
Katherine Harley - Administrator

Evelina Haverfield - Also worked at other SWH facilities
Etta Helen Maude Inglis - Orderly, Nurse, sister of Florence Elsie Inglis, niece of Elsie Maud Ingles
Violet Inglis - Orderly, sister of Florence Elsie Inglis, niece of Elsie Maud Ingles
Mabel Effie Jeffery - Nurse
Anna George Kreil - Orderly
Isa Andrews Larnoch - Nurse
Mary Crockatt Leuchars - Orderly
Jean Marjorie Lindsay - Orderly
Dorothy Littlejohn - Cook
Jessie MacPherson - Cook
Elizabeth Forbes MacPherson - Orderly and Storekeeper
Jean Forbes MacPherson - Cook
Agnes Williamina Manson - Orderly
Eveline Christiana Martin - Clerk
Eunice Jean McGregor - Ambulance driver
Florence Cecilia Moffat - Orderly, Physiotherapist
Alison May Nicholson - Orderly, sister of Ruth Nicholson
Margaret Nicolson - Nurse
Catherine Bride O'Rorke - Nurse, awarded by the French Government the Médaille militaire
Winifred Parry - Nurse
M. A. Prys-Owen - Nurse
Norah Quihampton - Nurse
Ishobel Ross - Also worked at other SWH facilities
Ruth Scott - Orderly
Madge Ramsay Smith - Secretary and Administrator
Marjorie Starr - Orderly
Nettie Stein - Orderly
Jean Thom - Nurse
Mary Moir Trail - Orderly
Maude Evelyn Waddle - Orderly
Beatrice Victoria Warr - Nurse
Dulcie Mary White - Nurse
Irene Mildred Whittet - Nurse
Theodora Williamson - Orderly
Maud Winstanly - Nurse, Matron
Florence Stanley Winter - Nurse

Further Information 
A group photograph (with names) of Royaumont staff can be seen here https://archiveandlibrary.rcsed.ac.uk/special-collections/scottish-womens-hospitals-for-foreign-service/scottish-womens-hospitals-at-royaumont-france/1342699-group-photograph-of-royaumont-staff?

References

External links

 Scarletfinders: Scottish Women's Hospitals Index of Names http://www.scarletfinders.co.uk/138.html
 List of names (subscription site) preview online https://www.scribd.com/doc/254467686/Untitled

Military hospitals in France
Military medical organizations
France in World War I
United Kingdom in World War I
British women in World War I
Voluntary hospitals
Scottish Women's Hospitals for Foreign Service